Haxby & Gillespie was an architectural firm from Fargo, North Dakota.  R. J. Haxby and William D. Gillespie were the partners. The firm "produced a number of important buildings throughout North Dakota."  They designed many notable public, educational, commercial, and church buildings, in North Dakota, Minnesota, and Montana.

History
Prior to coming to Fargo, R. J. Haxby was a practicing architect in New York City and Superior, Wisconsin.  He moved to Fargo late in 1905 after a young architect, William D. Gillespie, advertised for a business partner to take over the practice of his recently deceased brother-in-law, William C. Albrant.

In early 1906 Haxby and Gillespie reorganized Albrant's firm as R. J. Haxby & Company.  In September 1906 the firm was renamed Haxby & Gillespie.  They remained together until 1916, when Gillespie established his own office.  Haxby's firm became Haxby & Braseth, which it remained until the end of 1917, as Haxby had died in August.  It was succeeded by Braseth & Rosatti.

Gillespie later retired from architecture and founded a bank, the Gate City Savings and Loan, which became prominent in the state. 

R. J. Haxby's son, Robert V. L. Haxby, was an architect in Minneapolis, where he was a partner in the firms of Stebbins & Haxby, Stebbins, Haxby & Bissell, and Haxby & Bissell. He was appointed Minneapolis' school board architect in 1915.

A number of the firm's works are listed on the National Register of Historic Places.

Architectural Works

R. J. Haxby & Company, 1906
 1906 - Farmers' and Merchants' National Bank Building, 102 8th St. N., New Rockford, North Dakota.
 1906 - Minot M. E. Church, 2 2nd Ave. SE, Minot, North Dakota. Demolished.

Haxby & Gillespie, 1906-1916
 1907 - Fargo Armory, 78 Broadway N., Fargo, North Dakota. Demolished.
 1907 - Port Block, 626 Front St., Casselton, North Dakota.
 1907 - Ross Public School, Central Ave., Ross, North Dakota.
 1907 - Sentinel Butte Public School, Byron St., Sentinel Butte, North Dakota. Demolished.
 1908 - Carrington High School, off U.S. 281, Carrington, North Dakota. Demolished 2008.
 1908 - Glen Ullin High School, 206 S. 2nd St., Glen Ullin, North Dakota. Demolished 1981.
 1909 - Carnegie Public Library, 426 Bemidji Ave., Bemidji, Minnesota.
 1909 - Hebron High School, 400 Church St., Hebron, North Dakota. Demolished.
 1909 - Ramsey County Jail, 420 6th St., Devils Lake, North Dakota.
 1909 - Van Es Hall, North Dakota State University, Fargo, North Dakota. Demolished.
 1910 - Hotel Evelyn, 224 3rd St. E., Thief River Falls, Minnesota. Demolished.
 1910 - Ladd Hall, North Dakota State University, Fargo, North Dakota.
 1910 - Valley City City Hall, 216 2nd Ave. NE, Valley City, North Dakota. Demolished.
 1910 - Wahpeton Armory, 421 E. Cecil Ave., Wahpeton, North Dakota. Demolished 2020.
 1912 - Old Main, Minot State University, Minot, North Dakota.
 1913 - Bowdon High School, 319 Warrington Ave., Bowdon, North Dakota.
 1913 - Hope City Hall, 107 Steele Ave., Hope, North Dakota.
 1913 - Pioneer Hall, Minot State University, Minot, North Dakota.
 1913 - Sykeston High School, 114 B St. NE, Sykeston, North Dakota.
 1913 - Walsh County Agricultural School, 605 6th St. W., Park River, North Dakota. Demolished.
 1914 - A. O. U. W. Building, 112-114 N. Roberts St., Fargo, North Dakota.
 1914 - Lowman Block, 406-410 Broadway N., Fargo, North Dakota.
 1915 - Wolf Point Public School, Wolf Point, Montana. Demolished.

Haxby & Braseth, 1916-1917
 1916 - Mayville High School, Mayville, North Dakota. Demolished.
 1917 - Woodrow Wilson School, 315 N. University Dr., Fargo, North Dakota.

Gallery

References

Companies based in Fargo–Moorhead
Architecture firms based in North Dakota
Defunct companies based in North Dakota